The Left Handed Gun is a 1958 American Western film and the film directorial debut of Arthur Penn, starring Paul Newman as Billy the Kid and John Dehner as Pat Garrett.

The screenplay was written by Leslie Stevens from a teleplay by Gore Vidal, which he wrote for the television series The Philco-Goodyear Television Playhouse 1955 episode "The Death of Billy the Kid", in which Newman also played the title character. Vidal revisited and revised the material for the 1989 TV movie titled Billy the Kid.
The title refers to the belief that Billy the Kid was left handed, and he shoots left-handed in the film, though this was a false conclusion drawn from a reversed photograph. The film attempts to portray Billy the Kid as a misunderstood youth who got mixed up in a cattle war and was dragged down by the hostile population of New Mexico.

Plot
Drifter William Bonney (Paul Newman), known as "Billy the Kid", befriends a cattle boss named John Tunstall, who is known as "The Englishman".  Tunstall is murdered by corrupt rival cattlemen led by the local sheriff in the Lincoln County War. Bonney plans to avenge the crime by hunting down those responsible and killing them in provoked gunfights.  His violent actions endanger his surviving friends and the territorial amnesty proclaimed by New Mexico Territory governor Lew Wallace.  Billy's former friend, Pat Garrett, becomes a sheriff and sets out to hunt him down.

Billy's worshipful companion, Moultrie, lionizes Billy's actions, fueling a series of dime novels that transform Bonney into a legend. Billy is disgusted with his fictionalization, and he rejects Moultrie. Embittered, Moultrie betrays Bonney to Garrett. In a final showdown, Garrett ambushes and kills the exhausted Bonney, who faces his nemesis unarmed in the hopes of ending his own life.

Cast
Paul Newman as Billy The Kid
Lita Milan as Celsa
John Dehner as Pat Garrett
Hurd Hatfield as Moultrie
James Congdon as Charlie Bowdre
James Best as Tom Folliard
Colin Keith-Johnston as John Tunstall
John Dierkes as Alexander McSween
Robert Anderson (credited as Bob Anderson) as Hill 
Wally Brown as Deputy Moon
Ainslie Pryor as Joe Grant
Martin Garralaga as Saval
Denver Pyle as Ollinger
Paul Smith as Smith
Nestor Paiva as Pete Maxwell
Jo Summers as Bride
Robert Foulk as Sheriff Brady
Anne Barton as Mrs. Hill
George Bell as Deputy
Joe Bell as Peddler
Orlando Beltran as Mexican Farmer
George Berkeley
Lane Chandler as Townsman on Street with Mason 
Mary Lou Clifford as Gypsy woman
Stephen Coit as Alexander Ganz, Photographer
Cecil Combs as Deputy
Jess Franco as Young Gypsy Man
Terry Frost as Angry Townsman
Robert Griffin as Morton
Norman Leavitt as General Store Clerk
Eve McVeagh as Mrs. McSween
Tina Menard as Mexican Woman
Boyd 'Red' Morgan as Soldier
Tessie Murray as Gypsy Woman
Joseph V. Perry as Clerk
Stephanie Pond-Smith	
Henry Rowland as Man on Street with Deputy
Oreste Seragnoli as Priest
Morgan Shaan as Man in Crowd
Dan Sheridan as Bucky
Fred Sherman as Clerk
Jorge Treviño as Ramírez
Glen Turnbull as Sergeant
Ernesto Zambrano as Old Gypsy Man

Reception
The film was a flop in the United States, but was praised by French film critics for its bold experimentation with the stereotyped American Western genre. In 1961 it won the prestigious Grand Prix of the Belgian Film Critics Association.

Comic book adaptation
 Dell Four Color #913 (July 1958)

See also
 List of American films of 1958
 Gunfighters
 Murder
 Revenge
 Sheriffs

References

External links

1958 films
1958 Western (genre) films
American Western (genre) films
Biographical films about Billy the Kid
Lincoln County Wars
Films directed by Arthur Penn
Films set in New Mexico
American black-and-white films
Warner Bros. films
Films based on works by Gore Vidal
Films based on television plays
Films adapted into comics
Revisionist Western (genre) films
Cultural depictions of Pat Garrett
1958 directorial debut films
Cockfighting in film
1950s English-language films
1950s American films